The national symbols of Grenada are the symbols that are used in Grenada and abroad to represent the country and its people.  Prominent examples include Grenada's coat of arms as a Grenadian symbol and its penny.

List of symbols